Syndrome of inappropriate antidiuretic hormone secretion (SIADH) is characterized by excessive unsuppressible release of antidiuretic hormone (ADH) either from the posterior pituitary gland, or an abnormal non-pituitary source. Unsuppressed ADH causes an unrelenting increase in solute-free water being returned by the tubules of the kidney to the venous circulation.

The causes of SIADH are grouped into six categories: 1) central nervous system diseases that directly stimulate the hypothalamus, the site of control of ADH secretion; 2) various cancers that synthesize and secrete ectopic ADH; 3) various lung diseases; 4) numerous drugs that chemically stimulate the hypothalamus; 5) inherited mutations; and 6) miscellaneous largely transient conditions.

ADH is derived from a preprohormone precursor that is synthesized in cells in the hypothalamus and stored in vesicles in the posterior pituitary.  Appropriate  ADH secretion is regulated by osmoreceptors on the hypothalamic cells that synthesize and store ADH:  plasma hypertonicity activates these receptors, ADH is released into the blood stream, the kidney increases solute-free water return to the circulation, and the hypertonicity is alleviated. Inappropriate (increased) ADH secretion causes an unrelenting increase in solute-free water ("free water") absorption by the kidneys, with two consequences. First, in the extracellular fluid (ECF) space, there is a dilution of blood solutes, causing hypoosmolality, including a low sodium concentration - hyponatremia. Then virtually simultaneously, in the intracellular space, cells swell, i.e. intracellular volume increases. Swelling of brain cells causes various neurological abnormalities which in severe or acute cases can result in convulsions, coma, and death.

Potential treatments of SIADH include restriction of fluid intake, correction of an identifiable reversible underlying cause, and/or medication which promotes solute-free water excretion by the kidney. The presence of cerebral edema may necessitate intravenous isotonic or hypertonic saline administration. SIADH was originally described in 1957 in two people with small-cell carcinoma of the lung.

Signs and symptoms

Gastro-intestinal
 Anorexia
 Nausea

Musculoskeletal
 Muscle aches
 Generalized muscle weakness

Neuro-muscular
 Myoclonus
 Decreased reflexes
 Ataxia
 Pathological reflexes
 Tremor
 Asterixis

Respiratory
 Cheyne-Stokes respiration

Neurological
 Dysarthria
 Lethargy
 Confusion
 Delirium
 Seizures
 Coma (from brain swelling)
 Death

Causes
Causes of SIADH include conditions that dysregulate ADH secretion in the central nervous system, tumors that secrete ADH, drugs that increase ADH secretion, and many others. A list of common causes is below:

Pathophysiology
Normally there are homeostatic processes in the body which maintain the concentration of body solutes within a narrow range, both inside and outside cells. The process occurs as follows: in some hypothalamic cells there are osmoreceptors which respond to hyperosmolality in body fluids by signalling the posterior pituitary gland to secrete ADH. This keeps serum sodium concentration - a proxy for solute concentration - at normal levels, prevents hypernatremia and turns off the osmoreceptors. Specifically, when the serum sodium rises above 142 mEq/L, ADH secretion is maximal (and thirst is stimulated as well); when it is below 135 mEq/L, there is no secretion. ADH activates V2 receptors on the basolateral membrane of principal cells in the renal collecting duct, initiating a cyclic AMP-dependent process that culminates in increased production of water channels (aquaporin 2), and their insertion into the cells’ luminal membranes.

Excessive ADH causes an inappropriate increase in the reabsorption in the kidneys of solute-free water ("free water"): excess water moves from the distal convoluted tubules (DCT)s and collecting tubules of the nephrons - via activation of aquaporins, the site of the ADH receptors - back into the circulation. This has two consequences. First, in the extracellular fluid (ECF) space, there is a dilution of blood solutes, causing hypoosmolality, including a low sodium concentration - hyponatremia. [There is no expansion of the ECF volume because as it attempts to expand, aldosterone is suppressed and atrial natriuretic peptide (ANP) is stimulated: both of these hormones cause isotonic ECF fluid to be excreted by the kidneys sufficient to keep ECF volume at a normal level.] Also, virtually simultaneously to these ECF events, the intracellular space (ICF) volume expands. This is because the osmolality of the ECF is (transiently) less than that of the ICF; and since water is readily permeable to cell membranes, solute-free water moves from the ECF to the ICF compartment by osmosis: all cells swell. Swelling of brain cells - cerebral edema - causes various neurological abnormalities which in acute and/or severe cases can result in convulsions, coma, and death.

The normal function of ADH on the kidneys is to control the amount of water reabsorbed by kidney nephrons. ADH acts in the distal portion of the renal tubule (Distal Convoluted Tubule) as well as on the collecting duct and causes the retention of water, but not solute. Hence, ADH activity effectively dilutes the blood (decreasing the concentrations of solutes such as sodium), causing hyponatremia; this is compounded by the fact that the body responds to water retention by decreasing aldosterone, thus allowing even more sodium wasting. For this reason, a high urinary sodium excretion will be seen.

The abnormalities underlying type D syndrome of inappropriate antidiuretic hormone hypersecretion concern individuals where vasopressin release and response are normal but where abnormal renal expression and translocation of aquaporin 2, or both are found.

It has been suggested that this is due to abnormalities in the secretion of secretin in the brain and that "Secretin as a neurosecretory hormone from the posterior pituitary, therefore, could be the long-sought vasopressin independent mechanism to solve the riddle that has puzzled clinicians and physiologists for decades." There are no abnormalities in total body sodium metabolism. Hyponatremia and inappropriately concentrated urine (UOsm >100 mOsm/L) are seen

Diagnosis
Diagnosis is based on clinical and laboratory findings of low serum osmolality and low serum sodium.

Urinalysis reveals a highly concentrated urine with a high fractional excretion of sodium (high sodium urine content compared to the serum sodium).
A suspected diagnosis is based on a serum sodium under 138. A confirmed diagnosis has seven elements: 1) a decreased effective serum osmolality - <275 mOsm/kg of water; 2) urinary sodium concentration high - over 40 mEq/L with adequate dietary salt intake; 3) no recent diuretic usage; 4) no signs of ECF volume depletion or excess; 5) no signs of decreased arterial blood volume - cirrhosis, nephrosis, or congestive heart failure; 6) normal adrenal and thyroid function; and 7) no evidence of hyperglycemia (diabetes mellitus), hypertriglyceridemia, or hyperproteinia (myeloma).

There are nine supplemental features: 1) a low BUN; 2) a low uric acid; 3) a normal creatinine; 4) failure to correct hyponatremia with IV normal saline; 5) successful correction of hyponatremia with fluid restriction; 6) a fractional sodium excretion >1%; 7) a fractional urea excretion >55%; 8) an abnormal water load test; and 9) an elevated plasma AVP.

Differential diagnosis

Antidiuretic hormone (ADH) is released from the posterior pituitary for a number of physiologic reasons. The majority of people with hyponatremia, other than those with excessive water intake (polydipsia) or renal salt wasting, will have elevated ADH as the cause of their hyponatremia. However, not every person with hyponatremia and elevated ADH has SIADH. One approach to a diagnosis is to divide ADH release into appropriate (not SIADH) or inappropriate (SIADH).

Appropriate ADH release can be a result of hypovolemia, a so-called non-osmotic trigger of ADH release. This may be true hypovolemia, as a result of dehydration with fluid losses replaced by free water. It can also be perceived hypovolemia, as in the conditions of congestive heart failure (CHF) and cirrhosis in which the kidneys perceive a lack of intravascular volume. The hyponatremia caused by appropriate ADH release (from the kidneys' perspective) in both CHF and cirrhosis have been shown to be an independent poor prognostic indicator of mortality.

Appropriate ADH release can also be a result of non-osmotic triggers. Symptoms such as nausea/vomiting and pain are significant causes of ADH release. The combination of osmotic and non-osmotic triggers of ADH release can adequately explain the hyponatremia in the majority of people who are hospitalized with acute illness and are found to have mild to moderate hyponatremia. SIADH is less common than appropriate release of ADH. While it should be considered in a differential, other causes should be considered as well.

Cerebral salt wasting syndrome (CSWS) also presents with hyponatremia, there are signs of dehydration for which reason the management is diametrically opposed to SIADH. Importantly CSWS can be associated with subarachnoid hemorrhage (SAH) which may require fluid supplementation rather than restriction to prevent brain damage.

Most cases of hyponatremia in children are caused by appropriate secretion of antidiuretic hormone rather than SIADH or another cause.

Treatment
How to manage SIADH depends on whether symptoms are present, the severity of the hyponatremia, and the duration. Management of SIADH includes:
 Removing the underlying cause when possible.
 Mild and asymptomatic hyponatremia is treated with adequate solute intake (including salt and protein) and fluid restriction starting at 500 ml per day of water with adjustments based on serum sodium levels. Long-term fluid restriction of 1,200–1,800 mL/day may maintain the person in a symptom free state.
 Moderate and symptomatic hyponatremia is treated by raising the serum sodium level by 0.5 to 1 mmol per liter per hour for a total of 8 mmol per liter during the first day with the use of furosemide and replacing sodium and potassium losses with 0.9% saline.
 For people with severe symptoms (severe confusion, convulsions, or coma) hypertonic saline (3%) 1–2 ml/kg IV in 3–4 h should be given.
 Drugs
 Demeclocycline can be used in chronic situations when fluid restrictions are difficult to maintain; demeclocycline is the most potent inhibitor of Vasopressin (ADH/AVP) action. However, demeclocycline has a 2–3 day delay in onset with extensive side effect profile, including skin photosensitivity, and nephrotoxicity.
 Urea: oral daily ingestion has shown favorable long-term results with protective effects in myelinosis and brain damage. Limitations noted to be undesirable taste and is contraindicated in people with cirrhosis to avoid initiation or potentiation of hepatic encephalopathy.
 Conivaptan – an antagonist of both V1A and V2 vasopressin receptors.
 Tolvaptan – an antagonist of the V2 vasopressin receptor.

Raising the serum sodium concentration too rapidly may cause central pontine myelinolysis. Avoid correction by more than 12 mEq/L/day. Initial treatment with hypertonic saline may abruptly lead to a rapid dilute diuresis and fall in ADH.

Epidemiology
The incidence of SIADH rises with increasing age. Residents of nursing homes are at highest risk.

History
The condition was first described at separate institutions by William Schwartz and Frederic Bartter in two people with lung cancer. Criteria were developed by Schwartz and Bartter in 1967 and have remained unchanged since then.

Society and culture
The condition is occasionally referred to by the names of the authors of the first report: Schwartz-Bartter syndrome.  Because not all people with this syndrome have elevated levels of vasopressin, the term "syndrome of inappropriate antidiuresis" (SIAD) has been proposed as a more accurate description of this condition.

References

External links 

Pituitary disorders
Syndromes
Oncological emergencies
Articles containing video clips